Victor Cardoso (born ) is a Brazilian indoor volleyball player. He is a current member of the Brazil men's national volleyball team.

Career
He participated at the 2017 FIVB Volleyball Men's U21 World Championship, 2019 FIVB Volleyball Men's U21 World Championship and 2018 FIVB Volleyball Men's Nations League.

Sporting achievements

Clubs

National team
 2018  Pan-American Cup
 2019  FIVB U21 World Championship
 2019  South American Championship

Individual

 2016 U19 South American Championship – Best Outside Spiker
 2017 U21 Pan-American Cup – Most Valuable Player
 2018 U21 South American Championship – Most Valuable Player

References

External links
 FIVB Biography

1999 births
Living people
Brazilian men's volleyball players
Place of birth missing (living people)
People from Birigui